The Oblate is the last novel by the French writer Joris-Karl Huysmans, first published in 1903.

The Oblate is the final book in Huysmans' cycle of four novels featuring the character Durtal, a thinly disguised portrait of the author himself. Durtal had already appeared in Là-bas, En route and The Cathedral, which traced his (and the author's) conversion to Catholicism.

In The Oblate, Durtal becomes an oblate, reflecting Huysmans' own experiences in the religious community at Ligugé. Like many of Huysmans' other novels, it has little plot. The author uses the book to examine the Christian liturgy, express his opinions about the state of Catholicism in contemporary France and explore the question of suffering.

Sources

External links
 Full French Text, at Internet Archive
 1924 English translation by Edward Perceval

1903 French novels
Catholic novels
Novels by Joris-Karl Huysmans